Thomas McDonald D'Arcy (22 June 1932 – 20 September 1985) was a Scottish professional footballer who played as a centre forward.

Career
Born in Edinburgh, D'Arcy played junior football with Armadale Thistle before turning professional with Hibernian in 1953. He later played for Southend United, Queen of the South and Stranraer, before retiring in 1960.

References

External links

1932 births
1985 deaths
Scottish footballers
Armadale Thistle F.C. players
Hibernian F.C. players
Southend United F.C. players
Queen of the South F.C. players
Stranraer F.C. players
Scottish Football League players
English Football League players
Footballers from Edinburgh
AFC Bournemouth players
Association football forwards